Djebel Messaâd District is a district of M'Sila Province, Algeria.

Municipalities
The district is further divided into 2 municipalities:
Djebel Messaad
Slim

District of M'Sila Province